Reginald Howard "Stretch" Carolan (October 25, 1939 – January 1, 1983) was an American football player, a tight end 
in the American Football League (AFL). He played seven seasons  the last five with the Kansas City Chiefs.

As a rookie with the Chargers in 1962, he was selected as an AFL All-Star. He earned a 1966 AFL Championship ring with the Chiefs in their victory over the Buffalo Bills, and played in the first AFL-NFL World Championship Game against the Green Bay Packers, commonly known as 

Carolan was a graduate of Sir Francis Drake High School in San Anselmo, California, and taught at Tamalpais Union High School District schools during the off-season.  While jogging around Phoenix Lake with a friend in Marin County, he went for an extra lap by himself, suffered an epileptic seizure, fell in the lake, and drowned at age 43.

His son Brett Carolan (b.1971) played football at San Marin High School in Novato, at Washington State in Pullman, and in the NFL with the San Francisco 49ers and Miami Dolphins in the 1990s.  The Carolans are among 161 pairs of fathers and sons documented at the Pro Football Hall of Fame to have played pro football.

See also
Other American Football League players

References

External links

University of Idaho Athletics Hall of Fame – Reg Carolan

1939 births
1983 deaths
Sportspeople from San Rafael, California
American football tight ends
Idaho Vandals football players
Idaho Vandals men's basketball players
Idaho Vandals men's track and field athletes
San Diego Chargers players
Kansas City Chiefs players
American Football League All-Star players
American Football League players
People with epilepsy
Deaths by drowning in California